is a railway station in the city of  Ishinomaki, Miyagi Prefecture, Japan, operated by East Japan Railway Company (JR East).

Lines
Rikuzen-Inai Station is served by the Ishinomaki Line, and is located 30.9 kilometers from the terminus of the line at Kogota Station. The station is also served by local trains of the Senseki-Tōhoku Line, which uses the same track.

Station layout
The station has one side platform, serving traffic a single bi-directional line. The station is unattended.

History
Rikuzen-Inai Station opened on October 7, 1939. The station was absorbed into the JR East network upon the privatization of JNR on April 1, 1987. Operations of the line and the station were suspended by the 2011 Tōhoku earthquake and tsunami of March 11, 2011. Services were resumed on March 17, 2013 on the Ishinomaki Line, and on August 6, 2016 on the Senseki-Tōhoku Line.

Surrounding area
Former Inai Town Hall
Inai Post Office

See also
 List of railway stations in Japan

External links

 

Railway stations in Miyagi Prefecture
Ishinomaki Line
Railway stations in Japan opened in 1939
Ishinomaki
Stations of East Japan Railway Company